Olivancillaria deshayesiana is a species of sea snail, a marine gastropod mollusk in the family Olividae, the olives.

Description

Distribution
This species occurs in the Atlantic Ocean from Uruguay to Brazil from Ilha Grande (Rio de Janeiro, Brazil) to Necochea (Buenos Aires, Argentina). It has a spawning period from September to January.

References

 Rolán E., 2005. Malacological Fauna From The Cape Verde Archipelago. Part 1, Polyplacophora and Gastropoda.
 Teso V. & Pastorino G. (2011) A revision of the genus Olivancillaria (Mollusca: Olividae) from the southwestern Atlantic. Zootaxa 2889: 1–34

External links
 MNHN? Paris: syntype
 Ducros de Saint Germain A. M. P. (1857). Revue critique du genre Oliva de Bruguières. 120 pp.

Olividae
Gastropods described in 1857